The Humanx Commonwealth is a fictional interstellar ethical/political entity featured in the science fiction novels of Alan Dean Foster. The Commonwealth takes its name from its two major sapient species, who jointly inhabit Commonwealth planets and administer both the political and religious/ethical aspects. They are the mammalian Humans of the planet Earth and the insectoid Thranx which dwell upon Hivehom.  The Commonwealth is described as a progressive, well-intentioned liberal democracy spanning many star systems, and is somewhat similar to the United Federation of Planets from Star Trek.  The Humanx Commonwealth is notable for its portrayal of a human–alien relationship that is not just mutually beneficial but symbiotic, allowing an amalgamation of the two species.

Commonwealth Stories
 Midworld (1975)
 Cachalot (1980)
 Nor Crystal Tears (1982)
 Voyage to the City of the Dead (1984)
 Sentenced to Prism (1985)
 The Howling Stones (1997)
 Drowning World (2003)
 Quofum (2008)

Stories featuring Flinx (a.k.a. Philip Lynx)
 The Tar-Aiym Krang (1972)
 Bloodhype (1973)
 Orphan Star (1977)
 The End of the Matter (1977)
 Snake Eyes (short story) (1978)
 For Love of Mother-Not (1983)
 Flinx in Flux (1988)
 Mid-Flinx (1995)
 Reunion (2001)
 Side Show (short story) (2002)
 Flinx's Folly (2003)
 Sliding Scales (2004)
 Running from the Deity (2005)
 Trouble Magnet (2006)
 Patrimony (2007)
 Growth (Short Story) (2008)
 Flinx Transcendent (2008)
 Strange Music (2017)

Icerigger trilogy
 Icerigger (1974)
 Mission to Moulokin (1979)
 The Deluge Drivers (1987)

Founding of the Commonwealth
 Phylogenesis (1999)
 Dirge (2000)
 Diuturnity's Dawn (2002)

Timeline

 Nor Crystal Tears (-89 AA) prequel	
 Phylogenesis (-60 AA) Founding of the Commonwealth 1	
 Dirge (-35 AA) Founding of the Commonwealth 2	
 Diuturnity's Dawn (0 AA) Founding of the Commonwealth 3	
 Voyage to the City of the Dead (106 AA)	
 The Emoman (?? AA but before Icerigger) Short story	
 Midworld (445 AA)
 Icerigger (548 AA) Icerigger 1	
 For Love of Mother-Not (548 AA) Pip and Flinx 1	
 The Tar-Aiym Krang (549 AA) Pip and Flinx 2	
 Mission to Moulokin (549 AA) Icerigger 2	
 Orphan Star (550 AA) Pip and Flinx 3	
 The Deluge Drivers (550 AA) Icerigger 3
 Chilling (550 AA) Icerigger short story	
 The End of the Matter (551 AA) Pip and Flinx 4
 Snake Eyes (551 AA) Pip and Flinx short story	
 Flinx in Flux (551 AA) Pip and Flinx 5	
 Mid-Flinx (552 AA) Pip and Flinx 6	
 Reunion (553 AA) Pip and Flinx 7
 Sideshow (554 AA) Pip and Flinx short story	
 Drowning World (554 AA)	
 Quofum (555 AA)
 Flinx's Folly (557 AA) Pip and Flinx 8	
 Sliding Scales (557 AA) Pip and Flinx 9
 Growth (558? AA) Pip and Flinx short story
 Running from the Deity (558 AA) Pip and Flinx 10	
 Bloodhype (558 AA) Pip and Flinx 11	
 Trouble Magnet (558 AA) Pip and Flinx 12	
 The Howling Stones (558 AA)	
 Patrimony (559 AA) Pip and Flinx 13	
 Sentenced to Prism (571 AA)	
 Cachalot (572 AA)
 Flinx Transcendent (? but after Patrimony) Pip and Flinx 14
 Strange Music (? but after Flinx Transcendent) Pip and Flinx 15

Adaptations
In 1987 Steve Jackson Games published the GURPS Humanx sourcebook for their GURPS roleplaying game.
Scheduled for 2023, Battlefield Press International will be releasing a new game for popular RPG systems.

See also

References

External links 
 
 Alan Dean Foster's official website

 
Fictional governments
Novel series